Panagiotis ("Panos") Skourletis (born 1 January 1962 in Athens) is a Greek politician of the Coalition of the Radical Left (SYRIZA). He served as the Minister of Productive Reconstruction, Environment and Energy from 18 July to 28 August 2015. From 27 January 2015 to 18 July 2015 he was the  Minister of Labour and Social Solidarity.

Biography

Skourletis was born in Exarcheia, Athens, in 1962. He studied economics at the University of Piraeus, where he became active in the Rigas Feraios youth wing of the eurocommunist KKE Interior. In 1990, he joined Synaspismos, and subsequently followed that party into Syriza. He became party spokesman of Syriza in October 2009.

References

External links
 

|-

|-

1962 births
Politicians from Athens
Living people
Syriza politicians
Greek MPs 2015 (February–August)
Labour ministers of Greece
Environment ministers of Greece
University of Piraeus alumni
Greek MPs 2015–2019
Greek MPs 2019–2023